The Freedom Monument (tavisuplebis monument'i), commonly known as the St. George Statue,  is a memorial located in Tbilisi, Georgia, dedicated to the freedom and independence of the Georgian nation.

See also 
 Freedom Square, Tbilisi

References

External links 

 . Tbilisi Municipal Portal. 2011.

Monuments and memorials in Tbilisi
Equestrian statues
2006 sculptures
Sculptures by Zurab Tsereteli
Saint George (martyr)
Sculptures of dragons
Sculpture of Georgia (country)